The Q notation is a way to specify the parameters of a binary fixed point number format. For example, in Q notation, the number format denoted by Q8.8 means that the fixed point numbers in this format have 8 bits for the integer part and 8 bits for the fraction part.

A number of other notations have been used for the same purpose.

Definition

Texas Instruments version
The Q notation, as defined by Texas Instruments, consists of the letter  followed by a pair of numbers mn, where m is the number of bits used for the integer part of the value, and n is the number of fraction bits. 

By default, the notation describes signed binary fixed point format, with the unscaled integer being stored  in two's complement format, used in most binary processors. The first bit always gives the sign of the value(1 = negative, 0 = non-negative), and it is not counted in the m parameter.  Thus the total  number w of bits used is 1 + m + n.

For example, the specification  describes a signed binary fixed-point number with a w = 16 bits in total, comprising the sign bit, three bits for the integer part, and 12 bits that are the fraction. That is, a 16-bit signed (two's complement) integer, that is implicitly multiplied by the scaling factor 2−12 

In particular, when n is zero, the numbers are just integers. If m is zero, all bits except the sign bit are fraction bits; then the range of the stored number is from −1.0 (inclusive) to +1 (exclusive).

The m and the dot may be omitted, in which case they are inferred from the size of the variable or register where the value is stored. Thus  means a signed integer with any number of bits, that is implicitly multiplied by 2−12.

For example,  describes values represented as unsigned 16-bit integers with implicit scaling factor of 2−15, which range from 0.0 to (216−1)/215 = +1.999969482421875.

ARM version
A variant of the Q notation has been in use by ARM.  In this variant, the m number includes the sign bit. For example, a 16-bit signed integer would be denoted Q15.0 in the TI variant, but  Q16.0 in the ARM variant.

Characteristics
The resolution (difference between successive values) of a Qm.n or UQm.n format is always 2−n.  The range of representable values depends on the notation used:

For example, a Q15.1 format number requires 15+1 = 16 bits, has resolution 2−1 = 0.5, and the representable values range from −214 = −16384.0 to +214  − 2−1 = +16383.5. In hexadecimal, the negative values range from 0x8000 to 0xFFFF followed by the non-negative ones from 0x0000 to 0x7FFF.

Math operations
Q numbers are a ratio of two integers: the numerator is kept in storage, the denominator  is equal to 2n.

Consider the following example:

 The Q8 denominator equals 28 = 256
 1.5 equals 384/256
 384 is stored, 256 is inferred because it is a Q8 number.

If the Q number's base is to be maintained (n remains constant) the Q number math operations must keep the denominator  constant.

Because the denominator is a power of two, the multiplication can be implemented as an arithmetic shift to the left and the division as an arithmetic shift to the right; on many processors shifts are faster than multiplication and division.

To maintain accuracy, the intermediate multiplication and division results must be double precision and care must be taken in rounding the intermediate result before converting back to the desired Q number.

Using C the operations are (note that here, Q refers to the fractional part's number of bits) :

Addition
int16_t q_add(int16_t a, int16_t b)
{
    return a + b;
}
With saturation
int16_t q_add_sat(int16_t a, int16_t b)
{
    int16_t result;
    int32_t tmp;

    tmp = (int32_t)a + (int32_t)b;
    if (tmp > 0x7FFF)
        tmp = 0x7FFF;
    if (tmp < -1 * 0x8000)
        tmp = -1 * 0x8000;
    result = (int16_t)tmp;

    return result;
}
Unlike floating point ±Inf, saturated results are not sticky and will unsaturate on adding a negative value to a positive saturated value (0x7FFF) and vice versa in that implementation shown. In assembly language, the Signed Overflow flag can be used to avoid the typecasts needed for that C implementation.

Subtraction
int16_t q_sub(int16_t a, int16_t b)
{
    return a - b;
}

Multiplication
// precomputed value:
#define K   (1 << (Q - 1))
 
// saturate to range of int16_t
int16_t sat16(int32_t x)
{
	if (x > 0x7FFF) return 0x7FFF;
	else if (x < -0x8000) return -0x8000;
	else return (int16_t)x;
}

int16_t q_mul(int16_t a, int16_t b)
{
    int16_t result;
    int32_t temp;

    temp = (int32_t)a * (int32_t)b; // result type is operand's type
    // Rounding; mid values are rounded up
    temp += K;
    // Correct by dividing by base and saturate result
    result = sat16(temp >> Q);

    return result;
}

Division
int16_t q_div(int16_t a, int16_t b)
{
    /* pre-multiply by the base (Upscale to Q16 so that the result will be in Q8 format) */
    int32_t temp = (int32_t)a << Q;
    /* Rounding: mid values are rounded up (down for negative values). */
    /* OR compare most significant bits i.e. if (((temp >> 31) & 1) == ((b >> 15) & 1)) */
    if ((temp >= 0 && b >= 0) || (temp < 0 && b < 0)) {   
        temp += b / 2;    /* OR shift 1 bit i.e. temp += (b >> 1); */
    } else {
        temp -= b / 2;    /* OR shift 1 bit i.e. temp -= (b >> 1); */
    }
    return (int16_t)(temp / b);
}

See also
 Binary scaling
 Fixed-point arithmetic
 Floating-point arithmetic

References

Further reading
  (Note: the accuracy of the article is in dispute; see discussion.)

External links
 
 

Computer arithmetic